Joseph Grima (18 April 1973) is an Australian professional rugby league football coach, most recently head coach of the London Broncos.

Managerial career
Grima has extensive experience in the NRL as an assistant coach at Parramatta Eels, Cronulla Sharks and the St George-Illawarra Dragons.

He was appointed as the assistant coach at the capital Super League club, London Broncos ahead of the 2014 season after being recommended by Jamie Soward to former head coach Tony Rea.

On 14 May he was appointed as head coach of the English capital side and signed a deal until the end of 2015. His first game in charge, London lost to Huddersfield Giants 16–30 at The Hive Stadium on 10 May  and at the Magic Weekend on 17 May they narrowly lost to Catalans Dragons 22–24 at the Etihad Stadium. His first 2 games in charge were the two best performances by the Broncos in 2014.

On 13 July 2014, Grima's London Broncos were relegated to the Kingstone Press Championship. Grima started to rebuild all aspects of the club signing/resigning 17 players to date from the academy, current players and players in key positions such as Richard Mathers, William Barthau, Nick Slyney, Josh Cordoba and Rhys Williams in preparation for life in the 2nd tier for the 1st time in 20 years.

After 12 consecutive defeats for Grima in charge of the Broncos, he won his first game against Super League giants Leeds Rhinos 40–36 at The Hive.

On 9 October 2014, London Broncos announced Grima had signed a 2-year contract extension to keep him as head coach until the end of 2016. He won his second game as Broncos head coach 26–22 against Doncaster in the Broncos' first game in the Championship.

On 2 March 2015, a day after a 12–25 defeat away to Leigh Centurions, Grima announced he was to step down as Broncos coach with immediate effect due to family reasons, moving home to Australia.

International Management
Between 2004 and 2006, Grima was the head coach of Malta after founding the MRL (Malta Rugby League).

Statistics

References

1973 births
Living people
Australian rugby league coaches
London Broncos coaches
Malta national rugby league team coaches